Albert Bernard Voorn (born 23 May 1956, in Hilversum) is a Dutch equestrian and Olympic medalist.

His son is Vincent Voorn who also competed as an international show jumper.

Olympic record
Voorn competed at the 2000 Summer Olympics held in Sydney, where he won a silver medal in Individual Jumping.

National and International Championship results

References

1956 births
Living people
Dutch show jumping riders
Equestrians at the 2000 Summer Olympics
Olympic equestrians of the Netherlands
Dutch male equestrians
Olympic medalists in equestrian
Olympic silver medalists for the Netherlands
Sportspeople from Hilversum
Medalists at the 2000 Summer Olympics